Park Jieun (born November 4, 1983) is a South Korean professional Go player of 9-dan rank. In 2008, she became the third female go player in history to achieve 9-dan rank, following Rui Naiwei and Feng Yun.

Career

Park became a professional Go player in 1997. She studied Go under .

In 2008, she won an international women's title in the Sino-Ocean Cup, a tournament held one time only. She defeated Rui Naiwei in the finals to win the championship. Under the Korea Baduk Association's rules, she was promoted to 9 dan for the victory, becoming the first Korean female 9 dan professional.

She won the Bingsheng Cup in 2010, and again in 2011.

In 2017, she became the first Korean female professional Go player to reach 1000 career games played.

References

External links
 Biography on Sensei's Library
 Korea Baduk Association profile (in Korean)

South Korean Go players
Living people
1983 births
Female Go players